The Hudson River State Hospital is a former New York state psychiatric hospital which operated from 1873 until its closure in the early 2000s. The campus is notable for its main building, known as a "Kirkbride," which has been designated a National Historic Landmark due to its exemplary High Victorian Gothic architecture, the first use of that style for an American institutional building. It is located on US 9 on the Poughkeepsie-Hyde Park town line.

Frederick Clarke Withers designed the hospital's buildings in 1867. Calvert Vaux and Frederick Law Olmsted designed the grounds. It was intended to be completed quickly, but went far over its original schedule and budget. The hospital opened on October 18, 1871 as the Hudson River State Hospital for the Insane and admitted its first 40 patients. Construction, however, was far from over and would continue for another 25 years. A century later, it was slowly closed down as psychiatric treatment had changed enough that large hospitals were no longer needed, and its services had been served by the nearby Hudson River Psychiatric Center until that facility's closure in January 2012.

The campus was closed and abandoned in 2003 and fell into a state of disrepair. Authorities struggled with the risk of arson and vandals after suspicion of an intentionally set fire. The male bedding ward, south of the main building, was critically damaged in a 2007 fire caused by lightning. The property was sold to an unnamed buyer in November 2013. The site is currently being developed as a $300 million mixed-use project called Hudson Heritage, which will include 750 residential units, commercial space, medical office space, a hotel, and a conference center.

Buildings

The Hospital includes a number of unique buildings:
Main Building (the Kirkbride), a High Victorian Gothic building used for administrative purposes. This building will be preserved for future purposes.
Patient Wings, which split off the Kirkbride, housed patients. The male ward splits off to the south, and is much larger than the female wing to the north. It was struck by lightning on May 31, 2007, igniting a serious fire. These wings will be demolished sometime in the future.
Presbyterian and Roman Catholic churches were available to patients, one of which was near the male ward. One of the churches will be preserved for future use.
A morgue, with refrigerated cold chambers was located on the northeast corner of the property. This building will be demolished sometime in the future.
A power house was built, and still stands, to the northeast of the Kirkbride to provide power to the various buildings. Its smokestack is visible from Route 9 as well as nearby Marist College. This building will be demolished sometime in the future.
Ryon Hall opened in 1934 and housed violent or criminally insane patients. It was on the very southern property line, visible from Home Depot, in the shadow of the much larger Cheney Building. The building was demolished on October 14, 2019.
The Clarence O. Cheney Building, opened in 1952, is a ten-story steel structure with a brick facade. Named after Dr. Clarence O. Cheney, MD (1887-1947), the president of the American Psychiatric Association from 1935 to 1936, and hospital's superintendent from the 1920s until 1946, the building held doctor's offices and medical examination rooms. The building did provide some patient housing. This building was demolished in 2020.
The Herman B. Snow Rehabilitation Center opened in 1971 and provided recreational relief for patients, sporting two bowling alley lanes, a lunch counter, an auditorium, a basketball court, and an indoor swimming pool. The building featured a modern concrete and glass construction with angular asymmetrical wings. Skylights provided natural lighting. This building was demolished in 2019.

History
The entire facility was built over the last three decades of the 19th century, at great cost. Once complete, it would be used as intended for much of the first half of the next century. As psychiatry moved away from inpatient treatments, it began to decline in use until its closure at century's end. Today, it is slowly deteriorating out of public view as it awaits reuse.

19th century
New York had opened what has since become Utica Psychiatric Center in 1843, the first state-run institution for the mentally ill. By the Civil War it was reaching its capacity, so in 1866 then Governor Reuben Fenton appointed a five-member state commission to look for a site for a second hospital in the Hudson Valley between New York and Albany, to serve New York City and the counties of Eastern New York. In January of the following year the members reported to the governor that they had temporarily secured a  tract of land overlooking the Hudson River north of Poughkeepsie, formerly part of the estates of James Roosevelt and William A. Davis. It would cost nothing as the citizens of Dutchess County would be offering it to the state as a gift. Two months later, the state accepted.

A nine-member Board of Managers was created and appointed to initiate and oversee construction of the actual building. They chose architect Frederick Clarke Withers to design a building according to the Kirkbride Plan, then a popular theory for the design of mental institutions. Withers planned a building 1,500 feet (457 m) in length and over 500,000 square feet (45,000 m2) in area, most of it two wings that would house patients. It was the first institutional building in the U.S. designed in the High Victorian Gothic style. Calvert Vaux and Frederick Law Olmsted, designers of New York's Central Park, laid out the surrounding landscape. Like Withers, they had been mentored by the influential Andrew Jackson Downing in nearby Newburgh.

The centerpiece of his design was the administration building, which branched off into two wings, composed of six parallel pavilions that flanked the central structure. The two wings, designed to hold 300 patients of either sex, were divided by a chapel placed between them in the yard behind the administration building so that patients could not see into the rooms of the opposite sex. The building and landscape plan were meant to aid in patients' recovery, by giving them adequate space and privacy and imbuing their healing with a sense of grandeur.

Construction began in 1868, with the cost estimated at $800,000. Cost-saving measures included the construction of a new dock on the Hudson so that building materials could be shipped more directly to the site, quarrying and cutting the foundation stones on site, mixing concrete from local materials and hiring local craftsmen instead of a general contractor. The board also deviated from the plan it had sent the state, in particular by building a shorter female wing when it came to believe that fewer patients of that sex would be admitted. As a result, it is one of the few Kirkbride hospitals to have been built with asymmetrical wings.

Spending controversies and delays
Despite the efforts to save money, the board was slightly over the $100,000 it had expected to spend that year, according to its first annual report. The main building was completed and opened, with 40 patients admitted, in October 1871. As work continued on other structures planned for the complex, so did the cost overruns. In 1873, the year county residents had been promised the hospital would be finished, the New York Times ran an editorial harshly criticizing the board for not only having gone way over budget but for lavish extravagance and waste:

Some efforts were made to stop the project, but the legislature continued to appropriate funds despite further revelations like these. Construction continued until 1895, when further money could not be found. Despite this expenditure of time and money, the hospital's original plan was still not complete, and never would be.

20th century
A Refrigerating Plant was built 1948 and a Tubercular Hospital was built in 1951 to the designs of Samuel Juster of DePace & Juster. Buildings continued to be opened and reopened in the 20th century, and as late as 1952 the institution was treating as many as 6,000 patients.

Changes in the treatment of mental illness, such as psychotherapy and psychotropic drugs, were making large-scale facilities relics and allowing more patients to lead more normal lives without being committed. A major fire destroyed a hospital wing in the 1960s and threatened to spread to the administration building, but was halted in a connecting hallway. The section was rebuilt, although some large roof beams still showed evidence of the earlier fire. Though 1971 saw the addition of the Snow Recreational center, by the late 1970s the hospital administration had decided to shut down the two main wings as few patients were residing in them and due to neglect some of the floors had collapsed. The hospital housed 1,780 patients by 1976. The state offices of Mental Health and Historic Preservation clashed over a plan to demolish the wings, even after the National Historic Landmark designation in 1989.

In the 1990s, more and more of the hospital site would be abandoned as its services were needed less and less. It was consolidated with another Dutchess County mental hospital, Hudson River Psychiatric Center, in 1994 and closed in 2003. The center moved operations into a much smaller building nearby, Ross Pavilion, located on a hilltop on the east side of Rt 9G.

21st century
In 2005, the state sold the property and subsequently, the Empire State Development Corporation sold  including the Main Building to Hudson Heritage LLC, a subsidiary of the Chazen Companies, for $2.75 million. Hudson Heritage and Chazen had planned to thoroughly renovate the Main Building into a combination hotel/apartment complex as the centerpiece of a residential/commercial campus, Hudson Heritage Park.

 
Redevelopment plans hit two setbacks in the mid- to late-2000s: in 2005, the Town of Poughkeepsie imposed a moratorium on new construction to cope with its growth. Hudson Heritage had been seeking to have a "historic revitalization district" created for the property that would help spur its growth.

Then, on May 31, 2007, lightning struck the sprawling south wing, which held male housing, causing one of the most serious fires in Dutchess County's history. It is unclear whether that portion of the building can be effectively restored after such severe damage. The Administration building was again hit by fire on the morning on April 27, 2018.

In the meantime, the property has remained closed to the public, with signs posted at fenced-off entrances. Local firefighters have complained, after dealing with two fires in April 2010 that appeared to be deliberately set, that the property is not adequately secured against trespassing.

2010s
As of May 2012, the campus is owned by CPC Resources, a subsidiary of the New York City-based Community Preservation Corporation, a non-profit mortgage lender that finances multifamily developments. CPC has placed the 162-acre parcel on the market, citing that the poor economy has hindered timely development. Walmart has shown a strong interest in the property, but Poughkeepsie Town Supervisor Todd Tancredi noted that the Town Board cannot envision such a large piece of land used for a single store.

An unnamed buyer purchased the campus for an undisclosed sum in November 2013. The closing for the property occurred on November 8, 2013. The site is currently being developed as a $300 million mixed-use project called Hudson Heritage, which will include 750 residential units, commercial space, medical office space, a hotel, and a conference center.

Fire
An intentional fire was set on the morning of April 27, 2018 at the Hudson River State Hospital, according to Fairview Fire District Chief.  The fire was located in the wing of the old Main Administration building, and firefighters were dispatched around 3:45 AM; more than a dozen agencies responded with assistance.

Demolition
Demolition began on July 13, 2016 when smaller auxiliary buildings were torn down. The heavy vegetation that mostly hid the property from plain sight was cleared in summer 2019. The demolition of Ryon Hall, on the extreme southern end of the property, began on October 14, 2019. As part of the mixed use site, the "Kirkbride" main administration building, library, amusement hall, chapel, and the northernmost tower of the north wing will be preserved and put in to adaptive reuse. Also, the Great Lawn will be preserved. As of May 25, 2020, the fate of the other buildings on the North Campus is still unwritten and may be added for future use.

References

19. Rowe, Claudia May 30, 2001. "Modern Efficiency Displaces Historic Psychiatric Hospital". The New York Times. Retrieved 2007-11-15.

External links

Historic 51, site devoted to history and preservation of Main Building.
High Definition video from Kirkbrides HD
Forbidden Places, history, original postcards and photos from 2004.

Videos of 2007 fire

Hospital buildings completed in 1871
Government buildings completed in 1871
Buildings and structures in Poughkeepsie, New York
Defunct hospitals in New York (state)
Gothic Revival architecture in New York (state)
Hospitals established in 1867
Hudson River
Kirkbride Plan hospitals
National Historic Landmarks in New York (state)
National Register of Historic Places in Dutchess County, New York
Psychiatric hospitals in New York (state)
U.S. Route 9
Victorian architecture in New York (state)
Calvert Vaux designs
Frederick Clarke Withers buildings
1867 establishments in New York (state)
Hospitals disestablished in 2003
2003 disestablishments in New York (state)